is a series of science fiction novels written by Haruka Takachiho and published by Asahi Sonorama from 1977 to 2005 (an additional trilogy was published between 2013 and 2016). During the late 1970s one of the founding fathers of Studio Nue, Takachiho, decided that besides being a designer he would try his hand at penning novels. The result was Crusher Joe, a group of antiheroes who were not the typical self-sacrificing types but noble in their own right nonetheless.

Crusher Joe was made into an animated film in 1983 and two original video animation (OVA) episodes in 1989. The film version won the Animage Anime Grand Prix prize in 1983. The film features several guest designs by Katsuhiro Otomo, Akira Toriyama, Rumiko Takahashi and Hideo Azuma. In 2021, Takachiho revealed that he worked with Otomo on a sequel film "a long time ago." Otomo created a storyboard for the beginning of the sequel and gave it to Sunrise, but the project fell through. The movie and the OVA series were licensed for English release by Discotek Media in 2016.

A manga series illustrated by Yu Harii, titled Crusher Joe Rebirth, started in Kodansha's seinen manga magazine Evening on 12 September 2017; the manga entered on hiatus in February 2022, and the magazine ceased its publication in February 2023. Its chapters have been collected in five volumes as of February 2022.

Plot
Enter the tale of the Crusher Council, a group of rugged individuals known for assignments ranging from transportation to terraforming and everything in between. In the early days of space exploration the Crushers took on the job of destroying asteroids and defining space lanes. Because of their work, they were nicknamed "Crushers" which eventually became their business moniker.

Despite the rough and ready nature of the Crushers' work, they subscribe to a few steadfast rules. Unethical and illegal assignments are taboo, and any Crusher accepting one is barred from the Union. Of course, this presents problems for shady clients who try to trick the Crushers into accepting misleading assignments. They know that once the Union accepts a case the Crushers are honor-bound to follow it through. Among the various worlds, the Crusher Council has a stunning reputation, and among the Crushers, the most elite team is the one led by Crusher Dan and his successor, Crusher Joe.

Characters
Joe
The headstrong leader of his Crusher Team, Joe became a Crusher at the age of ten and replaced his father as the active head of the Crushers. Now nineteen, he maintains his Triple A rating. Joe has an intensive dislike for authority (other than his own) and refuses to take orders from anyone, including his father. However, he does have a lighter side, which enables him to take the balance of a situation and to act quickly and calmly. He and Alfin are romantically involved.
Alfin
Princess of the Planet Pizanne who left her home and royal status to join the Crushers. After the Pizanne incident she sneaks aboard the Minerva and takes the late Gambino's place as navigator. Perky, bubbly and easily intoxicated, Alfin is also quick-witted and fearless. She and Joe are romantically involved.
Talos
Talos served with Joe's father, Crusher Dan, in the early days of the Crusher Union. After 40 years of being a Crusher eighty percent of his body has been replaced with cybernetic implants. These artificial limbs often come in handy (His left arm contains a machine gun). Talos is gruff and reserved and possesses enormous strength, a trait that has saved his teammates from more than one occasion. He serves as the team's pilot.
Ricky
At the age of fifteen, Ricky is the youngest member of the Joe Team but this in no way hinders his performance as the ship's engineer. Orphaned when gang members killed his parents Ricky stows away on board the Minerva. His sharp wits and instant reflexes soon establish him as a member of the team. Quick tempered and easily riled. His teammate Talos often finds himself restraining the young engineer. He also spars with Alfin like a younger sibling.
Dongo
The Dongo Mabot served with both Talos and Crusher Dan in the early days of the Federation. A robot with a warped sense of humor (he is often seen reading porn magazines), he is completely loyal and is capable of operating the Minerva when the team is absent.

Cast

Novels

Asahi Sonorama,  (November 1977),  (November 2000)

Asahi Sonorama,  (January 1978),  (April 2001)

Asahi Sonorama,  (January 1978),  (July 2001)

Asahi Sonorama,  (January 1978),  (November 2001)

Asahi Sonorama,  (January 1978),  (February 2002)

Asahi Sonorama,  (June 1979),  (May 2002)

Asahi Sonorama,  (1983),  (August 2002)

Part 1: Asahi Sonorama,  (November 1989),  (October 2002)
Part 2: Asahi Sonorama,  (March 1990),  (November 2002)

Asahi Sonorama,  (October 2003)

Asahi Sonorama,  (26 May 2005)

Novelization of the movie, Asahi Sonorama,  (January 1983),  (February 2003)

Asahi Sonorama,  (26 May 2005)

Video release
The 1983 film version was released on LaserDisc in 1996 with English subtitles. It was released on VHS in the United States by AnimEigo on 27 June 2000 in both dubbed and subtitled versions. A DVD released by AnimEigo on 23 September 2003 contained the original film and both OVA versions. All are now out of print. Discotek acquired the rights to retail the CJ movie and OVAs in English in 2016. The movie was released on June 20, 2020 while the OVA was released on August 25, 2020.

A version of the 1983 film was released in the UK on VHS, under the name Crushers. Aimed primarily at children, this version was dubbed into English. Particularly violent/sexual references were cut.

Video games

Crusher Joe: Kanraku Wakusei no Inbou was released in 1994 by Family Soft for the PC-98).

References

External links
 Crusher Joe: The Movie at the Internet Movie Database
 
 
 Paul Jensen's review at Anime News Network
 A feature on Crushers, a kids edited version of the Crusher Joe movie

1977 novels
1979 manga
1983 anime films
1989 anime OVAs
2017 manga
Asahi Sonorama manga
Bandai Namco franchises
Japanese science fiction novels
Kodansha manga
Novels by Haruka Takachiho
Science fiction anime and manga
Seinen manga
Shōnen manga
Sunrise (company)
Works by Fujihiko Hosono